Hannah Dominique E. John-Kamen (born 7 September 1989) is an English actress. She is known for her roles as Yalena "Dutch" Yardeen in the Syfy television series Killjoys (2015–2019), Ornela in the sixth season of the HBO series Game of Thrones (2016), F'Nale Zandor in Steven Spielberg's film Ready Player One (2018), Ava Starr / Ghost in the Marvel Studios superhero films Ant-Man and the Wasp (2018) and the upcoming Thunderbolts (2024), the title character in the Netflix mystery miniseries The Stranger (2020), and Jill Valentine in the film Resident Evil: Welcome to Raccoon City (2021).

Early life   
Hannah Dominique E. John-Kamen was born in Anlaby, Humberside, England, on 7 September 1989, the daughter of a Norwegian fashion model mother and a Nigerian forensic psychologist father. She has an older brother and an older sister. She attended primary school in nearby Kirk Ella, received her secondary education at Hull Collegiate School, and trained at the National Youth Theatre in London. In 2012, she graduated from London's Central School of Speech and Drama.

Career 
John-Kamen began her career in 2011, providing voice work for the video game Dark Souls. She went on to make appearances in episodes of television series Misfits (2011), Black Mirror (2016), Whitechapel (2012), The Syndicate (2012), The Midnight Beast (2012) and The Hour (2012). 

From 11 December 2012 to 29 June 2013, she took the lead role of Viva in the Spice Girls-themed West End musical Viva Forever! The musical premiered at the Piccadilly Theatre to largely negative reviews. The Daily Mirror, however, praised John-Kamen's performance and called it a "shame" that she and the rest of the cast were "let down by a clichéd plot and leaden dialogue".

In 2015, John-Kamen had a starring role in the SyFy series Killjoys. In 2016, she had a guest-star role on the HBO series Game of Thrones. That year, she appeared in the Black Mirror episode "Playtest" and an episode of The Tunnel. Addressing John-Kamen's role in Steven Spielberg's Ready Player One (2018), Kristen Tauer wrote, "While much of Ready Player One takes place in a virtual reality world, Hannah John-Kamen's character is unique in that she is rooted in the reality throughout the film." That same year, John-Kamen played Ava Starr / Ghost in the superhero film Ant-Man and the Wasp. In 2021, John-Kamen starred in the action-thriller film SAS: Red Notice and portrayed Jill Valentine in the reboot film Resident Evil: Welcome to Raccoon City. She was cast as Red Sonja in the upcoming film by the same name from Millennium Films but reportedly left the project for unknown reasons.

Personal life 
John-Kamen moved to London at the age of 18 and has lived there since. She enjoys playing the piano and is trained in various dances such as ballet, cabaret, jazz, salsa and tap.

Filmography

Film

Television

Stage

Video games

Music videos

References

External links 

 

1989 births
Actresses from Yorkshire
Alumni of the Royal Central School of Speech and Drama
English people of Nigerian descent
English people of Norwegian descent
English stage actresses
English television actresses
English video game actresses
English voice actresses
Living people
National Youth Theatre members
People educated at Hull Collegiate School
People from the East Riding of Yorkshire
People from Humberside
21st-century English actresses
Black British actresses
English film actresses